The following is a list of bands and artists that were involved with the British Invasion music phenomenon that occurred between 1964 and 1966 in the United States. (Artists shown in boldface are Rock and Roll Hall of Fame inductees.)

The Animals
The Beatles
Cilla Black
Chad & Jeremy
The Dave Clark Five
Dave Dee, Dozy, Beaky, Mick & Tich
Petula Clark
The Spencer Davis Group
Donovan
Adam Faith
Marianne Faithfull
Georgie Fame
Wayne Fontana and the Mindbenders
The Fortunes
The Fourmost
Freddie and the Dreamers
Gerry and the Pacemakers
Herman's Hermits
The Hollies
The Honeycombs
The Hullaballoos
The Ivy League
Tom Jones
Jonathan King
The Kinks
Billy J. Kramer & The Dakotas
Lulu
Manfred Mann
The Merseybeats
The Moody Blues
The Nashville Teens  
Peter and Gordon
The Pretty Things
Procol Harum  
The Rolling Stones
The Searchers
 Sandie Shaw
Small Faces
Dusty Springfield
Crispian St. Peters
The Swinging Blue Jeans
Them
Traffic (band)  
The Tremeloes
The Troggs
The Undertakers
Ian Whitcomb
The Who
The Yardbirds
The Zombies

See also
British Invasion
List of Second British Invasion artists

References

Sources 
 

Lists of bands
Artists
British music-related lists
Lists of British musicians by genre